Nancy Huddleston Packer (born 1925) is an American writer of short fiction and memoir, who is the Melvin and Bill Lane Professor in the Humanities, Emerita, at Stanford University.

Early life and education
Packer was born in 1925 in Washington, D.C., where her father, George Huddleston, was a member of the U.S. House of Representatives, representing Alabama’s 9th congressional district. She was one of five children, and as a child lived in both Washington and Birmingham, Alabama. She graduated from Birmingham–Southern College in 1945, and gained a master's degree in theology from the University of Chicago in 1947. She then studied creative writing with Hudson Strode at the University of Alabama.

Career
Packer's first published work appeared in Harper's in 1953, and other work appeared in Dude. In 1957, she married Herbert L. Packer, and moved to California with him when he was appointed to Stanford University as a professor of law. She was awarded a fellowship at Stanford University's creative writing center for 1959-60, and studied writing with Wallace Stegner, before joining the faculty in 1961 as a professor of English and creative writing. Her short stories appeared in the O. Henry Award Prize Stories in 1969 and 1981. From 1989-1993 she directed the Stanford University program in creative writing. Among her students were Michael Cunningham and Ethan Canin. She served as fiction jury chair for the 2002 Pulitzer Prize, and continued to teach creative writing through Stanford Continuing Studies.

Personal life
She is the mother of Ann Packer (author) and George Packer, both writers. Her husband died in 1972.

Bibliography 
1976 The Short Story: An Introduction (with Wilfred Stone and Robert Hoopes)
1976 Small Moments
1986 Writing Worth Reading: A Practical Guide (with John Timpane)
1988 In My Father's House: Tales of an Unconformable Man
1989 The Women Who Walk
1997 Jealous-Hearted Me
2012 Old Ladies

References

External links 
 "Nancy Huddleston Packer: An Oral History," Stanford Historical Society Oral History Program, 2012. 
 "Nancy Huddleston Packer: An Oral History," Stanford Historical Society Oral History Program, 2014. 
 "Nancy Packer: An Oral History," Faculty Senate Oral History Project, Stanford Historical Society Oral History Program, 2018.

1925 births
Living people
People from Washington, D.C.
People from Birmingham, Alabama
20th-century American women writers
American women short story writers
20th-century American short story writers
Birmingham–Southern College alumni
University of Chicago alumni
Stanford University faculty
21st-century American women